This is a list of foreign ministers of the Cook Islands.

1984–1989: Norman George
1989–1999: Inatio Akaruru
1999: Joe Williams
1999–2004: Robert Woonton
2004–2005: Tom Marsters
2005–2009: Wilkie Rasmussen
2009: Jim Marurai
2009: Sir Terepai Maoate
2009–2010: Jim Marurai
2010: Robert Wigmore
2010–2013: Tom Marsters
2013–present: Henry Puna

Sources
Rulers.org – Foreign ministers A–D

Foreign
Foreign Ministers
Politicians
 *